Persona 4: The Golden Animation is a 2014 anime television series produced by A-1 Pictures based on Atlus' Persona 4 video game. The series serves as an expansion of AIC ASTA's 2011 adaptation, Persona 4: The Animation, featuring new scenarios adapted from the game's 2012 PlayStation Vita port, Persona 4 Golden. Building on the adventures of Yu Narukami, a teenage boy who discovers a distorted TV World and obtains the power of Persona, the series focuses on Yu's encounter with Marie, a resident of the mysterious Velvet Room who seeks to regain her memory.

The 12-episode series aired on MBS' Animeism programming block between July 10, 2014 and September 25, 2014. Seiji Kishi, who directed the previous series, serves as chief director with Tomohisa Taguchi as director and Jun Kumagai writing the series composition. Shoji Meguro and Tetsuya Kobayashi provide the soundtrack. An original video animation episode featuring an alternate ending was included on the fourth Blu-ray Disc/DVD volume, released on December 10, 2014. The main opening theme is  "Next Chance to Move On" by Shihoko Hirata, whilst the main ending theme is "Dazzling Smile" by Hirata (performed by Kana Hanazawa as Marie in episode 11). The opening theme for episode one is "Shadow World", also performed by Hirata, while the opening theme for episode eight is "key plus words" by Hirata and Yumi Kawamura.

The series is licensed in North America by Aniplex of America, who simulcast the series on Crunchyroll, Hulu, Daisuki, and the Aniplex Channel. The series has been released on two subtitled Blu-ray volumes on July 21, 2015 and September 29, 2015 respectively.


Episode list

Home media
Aniplex began releasing the series in Japan on Blu-ray and DVD volumes from September 10, 2014. An original video animation episode was included on the fourth volume.

Notes

See also
List of Persona 4: The Animation episodes - An episode list of the 2011 adaptation by AIC ASTA.

References

External links
Official website 
Official website 

Persona (series)
Persona 4: The Golden Animation